Draycott is a hamlet in the English county of Worcestershire.

It is located on the A38 road due south of the city of Worcester. It forms part of the civil parish of Kempsey and the Malvern Hills district.

Hamlets in Worcestershire